Deerfield is a neighborhood in southwestern Lexington, Kentucky, United States. Its boundaries are Nicholasville Road to the east, RJ Corman railroad tracks to the west, Pasadena Drive to the north, and New Circle Road to the south.

Neighborhood statistics
 Area: 
 Population: 837
 Population density: 1,679 people per square mile
 Median household income: $54,581

External links
 http://www.city-data.com/neighborhood/Deerfield-Lexington-KY.html

Neighborhoods in Lexington, Kentucky